Joseph-Jacques Ramée (April 26, 1764 in Charlemont, France — May 18, 1842 at the Chateau de Beaurains, Noyon) was a French architect, interior designer, and landscape architect working within the neoclassicist idiom.

He was a student of the architect and landscape architect François-Joseph Bélanger.  In his lifetime, he worked in France, Denmark, Germany, Belgium, and the United States. He also published books on landscaping with his own numerous garden designs as examples.

Ramée is known for his work at Union College, in Schenectady, New York, where in 1812 he designed the first comprehensively planned college campus in America

Work at Union College

By the early 1800s he had already established a reputation as a skilled designer of landscapes combined with houses and other kinds of buildings.  New York State land speculator David Parish, for whose father Ramée  had designed an estate in Hamburg, Germany, persuaded Ramée to visit America in search of projects.

Ramée arrived in the northern Adirondacks in late 1812 to work on projects in and around the small towns on Parish's vast tracts. Parish also acted as agent in finding Ramée other work.  On a return trip to Philadelphia in January 1813, Parish introduced Ramée to Eliphalet Nott, the ambitious president of Union College anxious to relocate the school to a large plot he had already purchased for the purpose. Nott hired Ramée almost immediately to draw up plans for the new campus, for the sum of $1,500.

Ramée worked on the drawings for about a year, and construction of two of the college buildings, North and South Halls, proceeded quickly enough to permit occupation in 1814. The Union College campus thus became the first comprehensively planned college campus in the United States.

Images

References

External links 

 Union College
 Exhibit on Joseph Ramee with Exhibition Catalog by Paul Turner

Bibliography
 Paul Venable Turner: Joseph Ramée. International Architect of the Revolutionary Era. Cambridge/New York/Melbourne 1996
 Bärbel Hedinger und Julia Berger (Hrsg.): Joseph Ramée, Gartenkunst, Architektur, Dekoration, ein Internationaler Baukünstler des Klassizismus, Altonaer Museum, Deutscher Kunstverlag, München, Berlin 2003 
 
 
 

French neoclassical architects
18th-century French architects
19th-century French architects
French landscape architects
1764 births
1842 deaths
People from Givet